The 1996 Wigan season was the 101st season in the club's rugby league history and the first season in the newly formed Super League. Coached by Graeme West and captained by Shaun Edwards, Wigan competed in Super League I and finished in 2nd place, but went on to win the Premiership Final at Old Trafford against St. Helens. The club also competed in the 1996 Challenge Cup, but were knocked out in the fifth round by First Division side Salford Reds, and was the first time the club had failed to win the trophy since 1987.

In July 1996 Farrell was appointed Wigan's captain.

Background

The 1995–96 season was a shortened transitional season ahead of the switch to the Super League, which would see the league become a summer competition. Wigan won the league championship for the seventh consecutive season, and also won the final staging of the League Cup, defeating St Helens 25–16. Wigan's dominance was expected to continue in the summer era, and the club were odds-on favourites to win the inaugural Super League.

Table

Match results

Super League

Premiership

Challenge Cup
Wigan's fourth round Challenge Cup tie against Second Division side Bramley took place a week after the end of the previous season. Wigan progressed to the next round with a comfortable 74–12 win, and drew Salford Reds in the next round. Wigan lost 16–26 against their First Division opponents, ending the club's unbeaten run of 43 games in the competition, and was the first time they had been knocked out of the Challenge Cup since being defeated by Oldham in February 1987. The result is considered one of the biggest upsets in the history of the competition.

Clash of the Codes

In addition to their league and cup exploits, Wigan took part in a special two-game series against Bath, the reigning champions of rugby union's Courage League, with one game being played under the rules of each code. Wigan won the game played under league rules at Maine Road 82-6, but lost the union game at Twickenham by 44-19.

Squad

Transfers

In

Out

References

External links
Wigan Warriors Rugby League Fan Site
Wigan - Rugby League Project

Wigan Warriors seasons
Wigan Warriors